Chaenothecopsis is a genus of about 40 species of pin lichens in the family Mycocaliciaceae. Many of the species are resinicolous, meaning they grow on conifer resin or other plant exudates. Most common host plants are trees in the genera Abies, Picea, and Tsuga.

Taxonomy
The genus was circumscribed in 1927 by Finnish lichenologist Edvard August Vainio.

Species

Chaenothecopsis aeruginosa 
Chaenothecopsis australis 
Chaenothecopsis bitterfeldensis 
Chaenothecopsis brevipes 
Chaenothecopsis caespitosa 
Chaenothecopsis caucasica 
Chaenothecopsis khayensis 
Chaenothecopsis claydenii 
Chaenothecopsis debilis 
Chaenothecopsis diabolica 
Chaenothecopsis dibbleandersoniarum 
Chaenothecopsis epithallina 
Chaenothecopsis eugenia 
Chaenothecopsis fennica 
Chaenothecopsis formosa 
Chaenothecopsis golubkovae
Chaenothecopsis haematopus 
Chaenothecopsis heterospora 
Chaenothecopsis himalayensis 
Chaenothecopsis hospitans 
Chaenothecopsis hunanensis 
Chaenothecopsis kalbii 
Chaenothecopsis khayensis 
Chaenothecopsis leifiana 
Chaenothecopsis lignicola 
Chaenothecopsis marcineae 
Chaenothecopsis mediorossica 
Chaenothecopsis montana 
Chaenothecopsis nana 
Chaenothecopsis neocaledonica 
Chaenothecopsis nigra 
Chaenothecopsis nigripunctata 
Chaenothecopsis nigropedata 
Chaenothecopsis nivea 
Chaenothecopsis oregana 
Chaenothecopsis orientalis 
Chaenothecopsis pallida 
Chaenothecopsis parasitaster 
Chaenothecopsis perforata 
†Chaenothecopsis polissica 
Chaenothecopsis proliferata 
Chaenothecopsis pusilla 
Chaenothecopsis pusiola 
Chaenothecopsis quintralis 
Chaenothecopsis resinophila 
Chaenothecopsis retinens 
Chaenothecopsis rubescens 
Chaenothecopsis sagenidii 
Chaenothecopsis sanguinea 
Chaenothecopsis savonica 
Chaenothecopsis schefflerae 
Chaenothecopsis sinensis 
Chaenothecopsis subparoica 
Chaenothecopsis subpusilla 
Chaenothecopsis tasmanica 
Chaenothecopsis tibellii 
Chaenothecopsis tigillaris 
Chaenothecopsis transbaikalica 
Chaenothecopsis vainioana 
Chaenothecopsis vinosa 
Chaenothecopsis viridialba 
Chaenothecopsis viridireagens 
Chaenothecopsis weiana 
Chaenothecopsis zebrina

References

Eurotiomycetes
Taxa named by Edvard August Vainio
Taxa described in 1927
Eurotiomycetes genera